A claymore is a two-handed sword.

Claymore may also refer to:

Places
 Claymore, New South Wales, Australia
 Claymore oilfield

Arts, entertainment, and media
 Claymore (G.I. Joe), a character in the G.I. Joe universe
 Claymore (manga), a heroic manga series named after a group of its fictional characters (called Claymores)

Watercraft
 Claymore-class destroyer, a group of thirteen destroyers built for the French Navy in the first decade of the 20th century
 MV Claymore (1955), a mail boat
 MV Claymore (1978), a ferry
 MV Claymore (2018), a new vessel under construction for CalMac
 MV ''Claymore 2, a passenger and cargo ship

Weapons

 M18 Claymore mine, an explosive weapon

Other uses
 Scottish Claymores, an American-football team